Guilá Naquitz Cave in Oaxaca, Mexico, is the site of early domestication of several food crops, including teosinte (an ancestor of maize), squash from the genus Cucurbita, bottle gourds (Lagenaria siceraria), and beans. This site is the location of the earliest known evidence for domestication of any crop on the continent, Cucurbita pepo, as well as the earliest known domestication of maize.

Macrofossil evidence for both crops is present in the cave. However, in the case of maize, pollen studies and geographical distribution of modern maize suggests that maize was domesticated in another region of Mexico.

Location
It is at the very eastern end of the Oaxaca Valley.

Occupation
While the earliest human evidence in Guilá Naquitz Cave dates to about 10,750 years BP, inhabitation was not continual and was not year-long. Humans ceased living in the cave about 500 BP. Humans lived in the cave six separate timeframes from about 10,750 to 8,900 years BP and again from about 1,300 to 500 years BP. The earlier inhabitants were pre-ceramic hunter-gatherers who lived in the cave only from August to October–December.

Crop domestication
The earliest known evidence of the domestication of Cucurbita, which is native to the Americas, dates back 8,000–10,750 years BP, predating the domestication of other crops such as maize and beans in the region by about 4,000 years. This evidence was found in the Guilá Naquitz Cave and four other Mexican caves during a series of excavations in the 1960s, possibly beginning in 1959.

Further excavations at the Guilá Naquitz site were carried out in the 1970s by a team led by Kent V. Flannery from the University of Michigan. Subsequent more accurate dating using accelerator mass spectrometers provided more specific dates. Solid evidence of domesticated C. pepo was found in the Guilá Naquitz Cave in the form of increasing rind thickness and larger peduncles in the newer stratification layers of the cave. Wild Cucurbita peduncles are always below this  barrier. Changes in fruit shape and color indicate intentional breeding of C. pepo occurred by no later than 8,000 years BP.

The process to develop the agricultural knowledge of crop domestication took place over 5,000–6,500 years in Mesoamerica. Squash was domesticated first, with maize second and then beans being domesticated, becoming part of the Three Sisters agricultural system of companion planting.

References

External links 
 Guilá Naquitz Ancient Maize Maps

Cave sites in Mesoamerican archaeology
Early agriculture in Mesoamerica
Caves of Mexico